Loaded Bible is a series of one-shot comic books (and a comic book mini-series) written by Tim Seeley, with art by Nate Bellegarde, the first of which, Jesus vs. Vampires, was published in February 2006 by Image Comics.

Publication history
A follow-up was released May 2007 called Loaded Bible 2: Blood of Christ and it takes place right after the first one. Loaded Bible 3: Communion was released February 2008 and is the conclusion to the first part of the series.

The first issue of Loaded Bible: Blood of My Blood (a 6-issue mini-series) was for sale in comic book shops starting March 2, 2022.

Plot
The story starts with two acts: the discovery of vampires and the fact that the Christian religion has become much more fanatic. Then, a nuclear global war caused by the religion turns The Earth into an uninhabitable territory. Now, the second coming of Jesus Christ must save America from vampires.

Collected editions
The three comic books have been collected into a trade paperback:

Loaded Bible (168 pages, July 2008)

Loaded Bible is also available digitally through Devil's Due Digital.

Other media
Halo-8 Entertainment has optioned the rights to make an "illustrated film" of Loaded Bible to be directed by Matt Pizzolo, who had previously done Godkiller.

See also
Jesus Hates Zombies

Notes

References

External links
 Loaded Bible at Image Comics website
Loaded Bible on devilsduedigital.com
A review

Depictions of Jesus in literature